Italy participated at the 2019 Summer Universiade in Naples, Italy from 3 to 14 July 2019.

Medal by sports

Medalists

|width="30%" align=left valign=top|

See also
Italy at the Universiade

References

External links
Official site of Naples 2019 

Nations at the 2019 Summer Universiade
Summer U
Italy at the Summer Universiade